Karen Lee Killough (born 1942) is an American veterinary radiographer and writer of science fiction mystery novels under the name Lee Killough.  She lives and works in Manhattan, Kansas.

Writing career 
Killough began her writing career with short stories. After a conversation at a science fiction convention with Joe Haldeman and James Gunn, she became convinced that the only practical way to continue writing was to write novels. She enjoys the conventions, and has explicitly said that the idea for her novel Deadly Silents was given her as a gift by a fan with whom she had discussed law enforcement at a convention, who felt he would never get a chance to write a novel based on the idea.

Published works

Series 
Bloodwalk 
Blood Hunt (1987)
Bloodlinks (1988) 
 Blood Games (2001)
The first two were published in omnibus form as Blood Walk (1997)
Brill and Maxwell
The Dopplegänger Gambit (1979)
Spider Play (1986)
Dragon's Teeth (1990)  
All three were published in omnibus form as Bridling Chaos (1998)

Other books 
 A Voice out of Ramah (1978)
 The Monitor, the Miners, and the Shree (1980)
 Deadly Silents (1981)
 Liberty's World (1985)
 The Leopard's Daughter (1987)
 Wilding Nights (2002)
 Killer Karma (2005)
 Ancient Enemy (2013)

Collections 
 Aventine (1982)

Anthologies edited 
 Seeds of Vision: A Fantasy Anthology (2000) (with Jonathan Fesmire)

Personal life 
She retired in January 2000 after 29 years of working as a veterinary radiographer at the Kansas State University College of Veterinary Medicine. Her husband, Pat, lost the use of his legs by 1983 and must use a wheelchair.

References

External links
 at Meisha Merlin, publishers
Bibliography at SciFan

1942 births
Living people
20th-century American novelists
21st-century American novelists
American mystery writers
American science fiction writers
American women short story writers
American women novelists
Writers from Manhattan, Kansas
American radiologists
Women science fiction and fantasy writers
Women mystery writers
20th-century American women writers
21st-century American women writers
20th-century American short story writers
21st-century American short story writers